Oleh Pavlovych Rypan (born 28 July 1972) is a former Ukrainian football player.

External links
 

1972 births
Living people
Ukrainian footballers
Association football goalkeepers
Ukrainian Premier League players
Russian Premier League players
Ukrainian expatriate footballers
Expatriate footballers in Russia
FC Beskyd Nadvirna players
FC Ros Bila Tserkva players
FC Spartak Ivano-Frankivsk players
FC Karpaty Mukacheve players
FC Rostov players
FC Dynamo Stavropol players
FC Kremin Kremenchuk players
FC Chornohora Ivano-Frankivsk players
FC Vorskla Poltava players
FC Vorskla-2 Poltava players
MFC Mykolaiv players
FC Prykarpattia Ivano-Frankivsk (1998) players
FC Tekhno-Centre Rohatyn players
FC Podillya Khmelnytskyi players
FC Enerhetyk Burshtyn players
Ukrainian football managers
FC Prykarpattia Ivano-Frankivsk (1998) managers